The NPP Women's Wing is the main women's wing of the New Patriotic Party of Ghana. This is a special organ of the Party which promotes the policies and programs of the Party amongst women.

The women's Wing was formed with the primary aim of building a strong, disciplined and well-resourced women's network in Ghana.

References

Political parties in Ghana